Hervé Guilleux (born 15 February 1956) is a French former Grand Prix motorcycle road racer. His best year was in 1983 when he won the 250cc Spanish Grand Prix and finished the season in fourth place in the 250cc world championship.

References 

1956 births
Living people
French motorcycle racers
250cc World Championship riders
350cc World Championship riders
500cc World Championship riders